Assara proleuca is a species of snout moth in the genus Assara. It was described by Oswald Bertram Lower in 1903 and is found in Australia.

References

Moths described in 1903
Phycitini
Moths of Australia